CKRX-FM is a Canadian radio station that broadcasts an adult hits format at 102.3 FM in Fort Nelson, British Columbia. The station is branded as Bounce 102.3 and is owned by Bell Media.

The station originally began broadcasting on November 21, 1967 as CFNL operating at 590 AM, until the move to the FM dial was made in 1997. It originally aired a hot adult contemporary format under the Energy 102.3 moniker until mid-2011, where it changed to an active rock format under a new moniker, 102.3 The Bear. It is the fourth radio station in Canada to use this moniker, after CFBR-FM in Edmonton, CKQB-FM in Ottawa (which changed owners on January 31, 2014 and format two months later), and CKNL-FM in Fort St. John.

As part of a mass format reorganization by Bell Media, on May 18, 2021, CKRX flipped to adult hits under the Bounce branding.

Former logo

References

External links
Bounce 102.3

Krx
Krx
Krx
Radio stations established in 1967